Michael McCormick (born July 24, 1951) is an American actor who has appeared in many Broadway productions as well as national tours, off-Broadway and regional theatre, as well as television.

Early life and career 
McCormick was born on July 24, 1951, in Gary, Indiana, where his father was a steelworker. At 12, he made his stage debut in a touring company of Oliver! at the then-Sam Shubert Theatre (now CIBC Theatre) in Chicago. After the touring company, he performed on a return performance of Oliver! on broadway at the Al Hirschfeld Theatre. After Oliver!, in 1965 he was cast as one of teenage children of the lead characters in The Porcelain Year, an ill-fated broadway show written by Reginald Rose that closed quickly after poor reviews; McCormick said "It was a real drama. It was tough because I was just a kid and had never taken acting classes."

Following the disappointing experience on Porcelain, he returned to Indiana and had a difficult time rejoining high school midway through the first year. After high school, he was a theater student at Northwestern University and graduated in 1973, having won the senior best actor award.

Theater career 

His Broadway roles include The Wizard in Wicked, Judge in Hello Dolly!, Mack Sennett, Charlie Chaplin Sr. and McGranery in Chaplin, Mr. Greenway in Elf, Oscar Shapiro in Curtains, Grandpa Seth Who in How the Grinch Stole Christmas, Pop in The Pajama Game, Leary in Marie Christine, John Adams and Caesar Rodney in 1776, and Gangster (First Man) in Kiss Me, Kate. On tour, he starred as Max in The Producers and played Thénardier in Les Miserables, among others.

In 2022 he created the roles of Fred Colby and Tommy O’Rourke in A Beautiful Noise on Broadway. A review in Variety praised McCormick's "comedic talents" in the role.

Personal life
He lives in Connecticut with his wife Alison Bevan, who he met in a play, although they never worked together professionally since. She starred in a number of productions at the Repertory Theatre of St. Louis, among others, before leaving acting. They have one son together.

Acting credits

Selected theatre credits 
Sources:

References

External links

Living people
1951 births
People from Gary, Indiana
20th-century American actors
21st-century American actors
American film actors
American television actors
Northwestern University alumni
American male stage actors
American male musical theatre actors